Located just northwest of Edmonton, the Sturgeon Community Hospital is a 167-bed hospital that provides a wide variety of health services to the community of St. Albert and surrounding area.

Main services
The Sturgeon Community Hospital offers many services.
 Capital Health Hospital Foundations
 Cardiac Clinic
 Cardiac Rehabilitation
 Computed Tomography
 Coronary Care Unit (CCU)
 Day Programs
 Day Surgery Unit
 Emergency departments
 Fluoroscopy
 General Radiology
 Orthopaedic and Plastic Surgery specializing in upper limb — hand, wrist, elbow and shoulder — surgery in the Edmonton zone

References

External links
 Sturgeon Community Hospital at Capital Health
 Sturgeon Community Hospital at Alberta Health Services
 Sturgeon Community Hospital Foundation

Buildings and structures in St. Albert, Alberta
Certified airports in Alberta
Edmonton Metropolitan Region
Heliports in Canada
Hospital buildings completed in 1992
Hospitals established in 1992
Hospitals in Alberta